Shanghai Express is a 1932 American pre-Code film about a group of train passengers held hostage by a warlord during the Chinese Civil War. It was directed by Josef von Sternberg and stars Marlene Dietrich, Clive Brook, Anna May Wong and Warner Oland. The screenplay was written by Jules Furthman based on a 1931 short story by Harry Hervey. Shanghai Express was the fourth of seven films that Sternberg and Dietrich created together.

The film was released during the midst of the Great Depression. It was remade as Night Plane from Chungking (1943) and Peking Express (1951).

Plot

In 1931, China is embroiled in a civil war. Friends of British captain Donald "Doc" Harvey envy him because the fabulously notorious Shanghai Lily is a fellow passenger on the express train that he is taking from Peking to Shanghai. Because the name means nothing to him, they inform him that she is a "coaster" or "woman who lives by her wits along the China coast": in other words, a courtesan. On the journey, Harvey encounters Lily, who is his former lover Madeline. Five years earlier, she had played a trick on him to gauge his love for her, but it backfired, and he left her. She informs him frankly that, in the interim, "It took more than one man to change my name to Shanghai Lily." Lily clarifies that she still cares deeply for him, and it is apparent that his feelings also have not changed when she inadvertently sees a watch that she had given him with her photograph still in it.

Among the other passengers in first class are fellow coaster Hui Fei, Christian missionary Mr. Carmichael (who initially condemns the two "fallen women"), inveterate gambler Sam Salt, opium dealer Eric Baum; boarding-house keeper Mrs. Haggerty, French officer Major Lenard and a mysterious Eurasian, Henry Chang.

At a scheduled stop, Chinese government soldiers empty the train to check passports and apprehend a high-ranking rebel agent. Chang sends a coded message at the telegraph office. Later, the train is stopped and commandeered by the rebel army and its powerful warlord, who is Chang. He begins to question the first-class passengers, looking for someone important enough whom the government will trade for his valued aide. He selects Harvey, who is traveling to perform brain surgery on the governor-general of Shanghai.

While he is waiting for his aide to be brought to him, Chang talks with Shanghai Lily and offers to take her to his palace. She declines, claiming that she has reformed. When Chang refuses to accept her answer, Harvey breaks in and knocks him down. Because Chang needs Harvey alive, he does not retaliate immediately, but he does not forget the insult. He leaves Lily's room and has Hui Fei brought to his quarters, where he forces himself on her. Lily is taken back to the train and stays awake all night praying for Harvey.

When Chang's man arrives, Chang reveals to Lily that he has decided to blind Harvey for his insolence before releasing him. Out of love, she offers herself to Chang in exchange for Harvey's safety. Harvey is released unharmed, unaware of the danger that he was facing or of Lily's reason for going with Chang.

Hui Fei sneaks into Chang's quarters and stabs him to death while he is packing to leave. She informs Harvey about what she has done and tells him to retrieve Lily. He rescues her before the body is discovered, and the train departs. The missionary Carmichael, trusting his instincts, coaxes Lily to reveal the truth about how she had saved Harvey. She insists that he not tell Harvey because she feels that there must be faith for there to be love, and he agrees, telling Harvey only that he knows Lily is a very good person.

The train finally reaches Shanghai, and the passengers disperse. Harvey finds Lily and asks her for a new start and to forgive him for his lack of faith. She apologizes for withholding information from him and says that she has always loved him and will forever. They kiss amidst the bustle of the train station.

Cast
 Marlene Dietrich as Shanghai Lily / Madeline 
 Clive Brook as Captain Donald "Doc" Harvey
 Anna May Wong as Hui Fei
 Warner Oland as Henry Chang
 Lawrence Grant as Reverend Carmichael
 Eugene Pallette as Sam Salt
 Gustav von Seyffertitz as Eric Baum
 Louise Closser Hale as Mrs. Haggerty
 Émile Chautard as Major Lenard

Production

Shanghai Express is based on Henry Hervey's story "Sky Over China" (also known as "China Pass"), which was loosely based on the Lincheng Incident that occurred on May 6, 1923, in which a Shandong warlord captured the Shanghai-to-Beijing express train and took 25 Westerners, including Lucy Aldrich, and 300 Chinese people hostage. All of the hostages were successfully ransomed.

The story also echoes elements of Guy de Maupassant's short story "Boule de Suif" in that it consists of travelers stopped in a country at war and a woman is forced into intimate relations with the commander in charge. However, the denouement differs; in Maupassant's story, the woman does not murder the commander.

Paramount studio heads were concerned that the Hays Office kept a close watch on the film for its portrayal of Reverend Carmichael and the depiction of the Chinese revolution.

Although set in China, few Chinese actors appear in the film.

Shanghai Express film was in production from August to November 1931 and was released the following year.

Reception

The film was praised by Mordaunt Hall of The New York Times as a star vehicle for Marlene Dietrich: "Miss Dietrich gives an impressive performance. She is langourous but fearless as Lily." He also singled out other characters: "Clive Brooks's performance is also noteworthy...Warner Oland is excellent as Mr. Chang and Anna May Wong makes the most of the role of the brave Chinese girl. Eugene Pallette serves splendidly as Sam Salt."

Jonathan Spence, writing about the film's usefulness as a piece of history, feels that the real 1923 Lincheng Incident was far more dramatic, but says that Shanghai Express is nonetheless this is "a wonderful film, with great performances by Dietrich ... and Anna May Wong."

The critic for Senses of Cinema called Shanghai Express a "riotous exercise in excess in every area; the visuals are overpowering and sumptuous; the costumes ornate and extravagant; the sets a riot of fabrics, light and space; and all of it captured in the most delectable black-and-white cinematography that one can find anywhere." He discusses the film's interest in the questions of race and colonialism and notes the "peculiar bifurcation" of the film's view of race, as most of the respectable "white" characters in the film are seen as both flawed and racist. Only Dietrich, Wong, and, to some extent, "Doc" Harvey have any "real moral agency." He calls the film "surprisingly feminist," with Dietrich being a "strong, dominating presence" and Wong's character her equal.

Shanghai Express is memorable for its stylistic black-and-white chiaroscuro cinematography. Even though Lee Garmes was awarded the Academy Award for Best Cinematography, according to Dietrich, it was von Sternberg who was responsible for most of it.

The film was a box office success grossing $800,000 in rentals the USA and Canada and $1.5 million altogether in worldwide rentals.

Awards and honors

References

Bibliography

 
 French, Paul. Carl Crow, a Tough Old China Hand: The Life, Times, and Adventures of an American in Shanghai. Hong Kong: Hong Kong University Press, 2006. .
 Leong, Karen J. The China Mystique: Pearl S. Buck, Anna May Wong, Mayling Soong, and the Transformation of American Orientalism. Berkeley, California: University of California Press, 2005. .
 Liu, Cynthia W. "When Dragon Ladies Die, Do They Come Back as Butterflies? Re-imagining Anna May Wong." Countervisions: Asian American Film Criticism. Hamamoto, Darrel and Sandra Liu, (editors). Philadelphia: Temple University Press, 2000, pp. 23–39. .
 Nozinski, Michael J. Outrage at Lincheng: China Enters the Twentieth Century. Centennial, Colorado: Glenbridge Publishing Ltd., 1990. .

External links 
 
 
 
 
 Shanghai Express at Virtual History

1932 films
1932 romantic drama films
American black-and-white films
American romantic drama films
Films directed by Josef von Sternberg
Films set in 1931
Films set in China
Films set in Shanghai
Films whose cinematographer won the Best Cinematography Academy Award
Films with screenplays by Jules Furthman
Paramount Pictures films
Rail transport films
Films based on Boule de Suif
1930s English-language films
1930s American films